Pedro Bermúdez may refer to

 Pedro Bermúdez, 16th-century Spanish composer
 Pedro Pablo Bermúdez, 19th-century Peruvian politician
 Pedro Bermúdez Cousin, Venezuelan independence figure